The Prohibitory Act was British legislation in late 1775 that cut off all trade between the Thirteen Colonies and England and removed the colonies from the King's protection. In essence, it was a declaration of economic warfare by Britain as punishment to the American colonies for the rebellion against the King and British rule that became known as the American Revolutionary War.

The Prohibitory Act references two acts passed by the last session of Parliament that were known as the Restraining Acts 1775. It was referenced as one of the 27 colonial grievances of the American Declaration of Independence.

Background 
In October 1775, the Parliament of Great Britain, under Lord North, First Lord of the Treasury, decided that sterner measures would be taken to subdue the rebellion now underway in the 13 North American colonies. To that end, they decreed a blockade against the trade of the 13 colonists by passing the Prohibitory Act. "All manner of trade and commerce" would be prohibited, and any ship that was found trading "shall be forfeited to his Majesty, as if the same were the ships and effects of open enemies."

The goal was to destroy the American economy by prohibiting trade with any country. The Act, being a virtual declaration of war, furnished the colonists with an excuse for throwing off all allegiance to the king. John Adams regarded the Act as the straw that broke the camel's back.

Aftermath 
The Prohibitory Act served as an effective declaration of war by Great Britain since a blockade is an act of war under the law of nations. The colonies and Congress immediately reacted by issuing letters of marque, which authorised individual American shipowners to seize British ships in a practice known as privateering. Further, the Act moved the American colonists more towards the option of complete independence, as the King had now declared his "subjects" out of his protection and levied war against them without regards to distinction as to their ultimate loyalty or their petitions for the redress of grievances.

At the same time, the British had imported bands of foreign auxiliaries, including the Hessians, into the American colonies to suppress the rebellion. The British had also stirred up hostile bands of Native Americans on the frontier by the King's men to raid the colonists. Concluding that they no longer had the King's protection, the colonists responded with the Declaration of Independence.

References

External links
 American Prohibitory Act
 Contemporary (1780) Text of the Act

Great Britain Acts of Parliament 1775
1775 in the Thirteen Colonies
Laws leading to the American Revolution
Embargoes